S. Singaravadivel was an Indian politician and former Member of Parliament elected from Tamil Nadu. He was elected to the Lok Sabha from Thanjavur constituency as an Indian National Congress candidate in the 1980, 1984 and 1989 elections. 

Singaravadivel died on 31 January 2021 from COVID-19.

References 

20th-century births
2021 deaths
Indian National Congress politicians from Tamil Nadu
India MPs 1980–1984
India MPs 1984–1989
India MPs 1989–1991
Lok Sabha members from Tamil Nadu
People from Thanjavur district
India MPs 1977–1979
Deaths from the COVID-19 pandemic in India